Poupiniidae is a family of crustaceans belonging to the order Decapoda.

Genera

The family contains two genera:

 Poupinia Guinot, 1991
 Rhinopoupinia Feldmann, Tshudy & Thomson, 1993

References

Decapods